Spring Is Here is a live album by saxophonist Stan Getz which was recorded at Keystone Korner in 1981 and released on the Concord Jazz label in 1992.

Reception

The Allmusic review by Scott Yanow said the album featured "Getz's tone and strong improvising skills at their best".

Track listing
 "How About You?" (Burton Lane, Ralph Freed) - 10:08 	
 "You're Blasé" (Ord Hamilton, Bruce Sievier) - 5:32
 "Easy Living" (Ralph Rainger, Leo Robin) - 6:51
 "Sweet Lorraine" (Cliff Burwell, Mitchell Parish) - 5:34
 "Old Devil Moon" (Lane, Yip Harburg) - 10:18
 "I'm Old Fashioned" (Jerome Kern, Johnny Mercer) - 6:41
 "Spring Is Here" (Richard Rodgers, Lorenz Hart) - 7:46

Personnel 
Stan Getz - tenor saxophone
Lou Levy - piano
Monty Budwig - bass
Victor Lewis - drums

References 

1992 live albums
Stan Getz live albums
Concord Records live albums
Albums produced by Carl Jefferson
Albums recorded at Keystone Korner